Channa Mohallah may refer to:
 Channa Mohallah, Jacobabad, a town in Jacobabad in Sindh, Pakistan
 Channa Mohallah, Mian Sahib, a locality and neighbor of Mian Sahib